Michael King is a graphic designer from Portland, Oregon.  His career started in the late 1970s, when he started making concert posters for local punk bands in Portland. King's work includes an album cover for Jack Johnson, posters for Pink Martini, and the Voodoo Doughnut logo. He founded Crash Design America, a graphic design company in Portland.

References

External links 
http://www.crashamerica.com/

Living people
Artists from Portland, Oregon
Year of birth missing (living people)